ZT 300 is a series of 20 kN agricultural tractors, produced from 1 September 1967 to 1984 by the VEB Traktorenwerk Schönebeck. It succeeded the RS14 Famulus series, and unlike the Famulus, the ZT 300 series was sold under the brand name Fortschritt. ZT 300 refers both to the initial ZT 300 model, and the ZT 300 series. In total, 72,382 units of the ZT 300 series were made. The model with the highest production figure was the ZT 303, which was introduced in 1972. It features an automatic all-wheel-drive system; in the early 1980s, it cost 81.000 Mark. Starting in 1983, the ZT 300 series was succeeded by the ZT 320.

Chronology 

In total, the ZT 300 series consisted of 6 series production models and one prototype:

ZT 300: The base model with rear-wheel drive, meant for agricultural use
ZT 303: All-wheel model, it shares its front axle with the IFA W50 LA
ZT 304: A road tractor, no hydraulics, no PTO, no work lights, no powershift gearbox
ZT 305: Like the ZT 303, with additional twin tyres and enhanced dual-circuit brakes
ZT 300 GB: Based on the ZT 300, has rubber tracks instead of tyres
ZT 403: An engine upgrade for the ZT 303, the four-cylinder engine was replaced with a six-cylinder engine (type 6 VD 14,5/12-1 SRW) producing 110 kW
ZT 307: An engine upgrade for the ZT 305, the four-cylinder engine was replaced with a six-cylinder engine (type 6 VD 14,5/12-1 SRW) producing 110 kW. This model was only built as a prototype.

Some tractors were converted into road-rail-vehicles. They were mainly used in small DDR-plants for shunting.

Technical description 

The ZT 300 series tractors design is based on a combination of the frameless block construction for the rear part and a half frame for the front. This makes the rear axle an unsprung, rigid beam axle, whereas the front beam axle has a pivot point and allows wheel travel. The ZT 300 has a three-point-linkage with a lifting force of 17.65 kN and a PTO as well as a hydraulic system. Starting in 1974, an optimised hydraulic system was used, that automatically increased the weight on the rear axle by slightly lifting the farm implement attached to the three-point linkage, if required. This resulted in better traction and therefore greater drawbar pull force.

All ZT 300 tractors have a manual three-speed semi powerspeed gearbox with three forward and two reverse ranges, this results in a total of nine forward and six reverse gears. It allows speeds between 3.1 and ca. 30 km/h. A pneumatic two stage clutch of the type DK 80 is used to transmit the torque to the gearbox. The first clutch stage connects the gearbox, the second stage connects the PTO shaft(s), hydraulic system and the load stage of the gearbox. The load stage increases the torque transmitted to the wheels. It can be switched without having to stop the tractor by moving the load stage lever and pressing the clutch pedal. The rear axle also has a differential lock.

The engine is the 4 VD 14,5/12-1 SRW, a straight four-cylinder, direct-injected, diesel engine with a displacement of 6560 cm3. Initially, it was detuned to produce 66 kW at 1500 min−1, but in 1973, the power output was increased to 68 kW, and in 1978, to 74 kW at 1800 min−1. The maximum torque is 422 N·m at 1350 min−1. The specific fuel consumption is rated 238 g/kWh at 1350 min−1.

The initial ZT 300 models have a rack-and-pinion steering, whereas later models have a fully hydraulic steering system. Only the rear wheels have brakes. All tractors may pull trailers with a maximum payload of 24.000 kg, if the trailer has a pneumatic brake system.

All wheel drive system 

The all wheel drive system enables itself automatically using a roller-type overrunning clutch if the wheel slip is greater than 7–8 %. The front axle is same as in the IFA W50 LA, this results in less ground clearance compared to the rear wheel drive ZT 300 tractors. Like the rear axle, the AWD front axle has a lockable differential. The ZT 305 also has brakes for the front wheels, bigger tyres and rear twin tyres, it was developed for slopes with gradients of up to 45 %.

Forward and reverse speeds

Paint colours 

The ZT 300 series tractors were made with four different paint colours:

Vermillion/Grey-white/Squirrel-grey
Azure/Grey-white/Squirrel-grey
Reseda/Grey-white/Squirrel-grey
TGL 21196

References

Bibliography 

 Achim Bischof: Traktoren in der DDR. Podszun, Brilon 2004, .
 Klaus Tietgens: Fortschritt ZT 300. Typengeschichte und Technik. GeraMond, München 2014, .
 Jan Welkerling: FORTSCHRITT in allen Ähren. DDR-Landmaschinen im Einsatz. 2005.

External links 

Tractors
IFA vehicles
Vehicles introduced in 1967